Laribee may refer to:
 Laribee, California, former name of Larabee, California
 Russ Laribee, baseball player